Ballinard (Irish: Baile An Aird) is a townland in the parish of Desertserges, County Cork, Ireland.

References

Townlands of County Cork